Darryl Eugene "Dokie" Williams (born August 25, 1960 in Oceanside, California) is a former professional American football wide receiver who played in the National Football League for five seasons for the Los Angeles Raiders from 1983 to 1987.

Dokie and his wife, Tammy, have 3 children. Darryl, Tayler, and Imani.

High school career
At El Camino High School in Oceanside, California, Williams was a top football and track and field athlete.  He was the CIF California State Meet champion in the triple jump in 1977.  In 1978, he repeated in the triple jump and added the long jump title while also finishing fourth in the 100 yard dash.

College career
Williams began his career at UCLA where he was a wide receiver where he lettered in football in all four years. Williams graduated in 1983.  He also participated on the track and field team, where he is number two in the triple jump on the team's all-time list behind former world record holder (and Oceanside product) Willie Banks.

Professional career

Los Angeles Raiders
Williams was drafted by the Los Angeles Raiders with the 138th pick in the fifth round of the 1983 NFL Draft. He played five seasons in the NFL, all of which with the Raiders. Williams won a Super Bowl ring with the Raiders in 1983. His career ended after the 1987 NFL season.

Williams is now one of the girl's varsity coaches at Escondido High School, along with his older brother Cris Williams.

References

1960 births
Living people
American football wide receivers
UCLA Bruins football players
UCLA Bruins men's track and field athletes
Los Angeles Raiders players
Sportspeople from Oceanside, California
African-American players of American football
Track and field athletes from California
21st-century African-American people
20th-century African-American sportspeople